The Zukunfts-Rennen is a Group 3 flat horse race in Germany open to two-year-old thoroughbreds. It is run at Baden-Baden over a distance of 1,400 metres (about 7 furlongs), and it is scheduled to take place each year in late August or early September.

History
The event was established in 1859, and it was initially contested over 1,000 metres. It was extended to 1,200 metres in 1883.

The Zukunfts-Rennen was given Group 3 status in the 1970s, and it was promoted to Group 2 level in 1982. It was sponsored by Moët & Chandon from 1982 to 1996, and by Raab Karcher from 1997 to 1999.

Maurice Lacroix took over the sponsorship in 2000, and for a period the event was known as the Maurice Lacroix-Trophy. Its distance was increased to 1,400 metres in 2006, and the race returned to Group 3 level in 2007. The association with Maurice Lacroix ended in 2008.

Records
Leading jockey (5 wins):
 George Stern – Ob (1903), Champ d'Or (1904), Lord Burgoyne (1910), Quai des Fleurs (1911), Guerroyante (1913)
 Otto Schmidt – Augias (1922), Rosendame (1923), Faustina (1925), Adlerfee (1937), Schwarzgold (1939)

Leading trainer (7 wins):
 Mick Channon – Flying Squaw (1995), Muchea (1996), Golden Silca (1998), Checkit (2002), Mokabra (2003), Ajigolo (2005), Ayaar (2012)
 (note: the trainers of some of the early winners are unknown)

Winners since 1971

 Desidera finished first in 1994, but she was relegated to second place following a stewards' inquiry.

 Easy Way was first in 2002, but he was placed second after a stewards' inquiry.

 Nice Danon was the original winner in 2010, but he was demoted to second after an appeal.

Earlier winners

 1859: Atalanta
 1860: Meleager
 1861: Partisan
 1862: Le Marechal
 1863: Soumise
 1864: Clermont
 1865: Czar
 1866: Montgoubert
 1867: Le Sarrazin
 1868: Mademoiselle de Fligny
 1869: Florian
 1870: no race
 1871: Cigarette
 1872: Espagniola
 1873: Dorothee
 1874: Constanz
 1875: Vordermann
 1876: Kincsem
 1877: Sabinus
 1878: Picklock
 1879: Waidmannsheil
 1880: Balvany
 1881: Gyöngyvirag
 1882: Maria
 1883: Gabernie
 1884: Italy
 1885: Fenek
 1886: Bulgar
 1887: Kiralyne
 1888: Sappho
 1889: Yellow
 1890: Nordstern
 1891: Fra Angelico
 1892: Romito
 1893: Melchior
 1894: Gloire de Dijon
 1895: Trivial
 1896: Wolkenschieber
 1897: Habenichts
 1898: Gastfreund
 1899: Don Jose
 1900: Zuleika
 1901: Alençon
 1902: Mireille
 1903: Ob
 1904: Champ d'Or
 1905: Fels
 1906: Fabula
 1907: Sauge Pourpree
 1908: Roquelaure
 1909: Antwort
 1910: Lord Burgoyne
 1911: Quai des Fleurs
 1912: Laudon
 1913: Guerroyante
 1914–20: no race
 1921: Alpenrose
 1922: Augias
 1923: Rosendame
 1924: Marcellus
 1925: Faustina
 1926: Oberwinter
 1927: Contessa Maddalena
 1928: Walzertraum
 1929: Ladro
 1930: Tourbillon
 1931: Pancho
 1932: Alchimist
 1933: Pelopidas
 1934: Contessina
 1935: Nereide
 1936: Trollius
 1937: Adlerfee
 1938: Canzoni
 1939: Schwarzgold
 1940: no race
 1941: Blaue Adria
 1942: Contessa Pilade *
 1943: Träumerei *
 1944–47: no race
 1948: Donar
 1949–50: no race
 1951: Faubourg
 1952: Maruschka
 1953: Usurpator
 1954: Tactic
 1955: Liebeslied
 1956: Orsini
 1957: Andrea
 1958: Bennigsen
 1959: Angelica
 1960: Oceana
 1961: Amboss
 1962: Anatol
 1963: Skat
 1964: Radames
 1965: Doupaulette
 1966: Priamos
 1967: Gluck
 1968: Lemon Hart
 1969: Paroli
 1970: Isztopirin

* The 1942 and 1943 races were held at Hoppegarten.

See also
 List of German flat horse races

References
 Racing Post / siegerlisten.com:
 1983, 1984, 1985, 1986, 1987, 

 galopp-sieger.de – Zukunfts-Rennen.
 horseracingintfed.com – International Federation of Horseracing Authorities – Zukunfts-Rennen (2012).
 pedigreequery.com – Zukunfts-Rennen – Baden-Baden.

Flat horse races for two-year-olds
Horse races in Germany
Recurring sporting events established in 1859
Sport in Baden-Württemberg
1859 establishments in Germany